

Petula is a genus of moths belonging to the family Tineidae. There is presently only one species in this genus: Petula phalarata, that was described from Rapa Iti.

The wingspan is 9–16 mm. The forewing ground color is fuscous black, on the middle of the dorsum with a cream buff spot (in females, the spot is suffused, larger, and not as sharply defined as in males), sometimes extended as a narrow cream buff line on the dorsal edge. At the end of the cell is an ill-defined black spot. The hindwings are grey, paler basally, with a brassy hue.

References

Tineidae
Monotypic moth genera
Moths of Oceania
Tineidae genera